Hiroshi Tsubaki (born 18 May 1991) is a Japanese former professional cyclist, who rode professionally between 2014 and 2020 for  and the . Since retiring from cycling, Tsubaki now works as a barista in a coffee shop in Inagi.

Major results
2010
 1st  Time trial, National Under-23 Road Championships
2017
 Tour de Molvccas
1st Stages 4 & 5

References

External links

1991 births
Living people
Japanese male cyclists
Sportspeople from Tokyo